David Rayner (born 18 March 1982) is an association football player who represented New Zealand at international level.

He represented New Zealand Under-17 at the 1999 FIFA U-17 World Championship, appearing in all three group games.

Rayner made a solitary official international appearance for New Zealand as a substitute in a 3–1 win over Malaysia on 21 June 2000.

References

External links

1982 births
Sportspeople from Tauranga
Living people
Association football defenders
New Zealand association footballers
New Zealand international footballers
Expatriate footballers in England
Newcastle United F.C. players